The men's 1500 metres in short track speed skating at the 2014 Winter Olympics was held on 10 February 2014 at the Iceberg Skating Palace in Sochi, Russia.

The qualifying heats, semifinal, and the final were held on 10 February.

The defending Olympic Champion was Lee Jung-su of South Korea, while the defending World Champion was Sin Da-woon also of South Korea.

Records

Qualification
Countries were assigned quotas using a combination of the four special Olympic Qualification classifications that were held at two world cups in November 2013. A nation may enter a maximum of three athletes per event. For this event a total of 36 athletes representing 18 nations qualified to compete.

Results
The final results:

Preliminaries

Heats
 Q – qualified for the semifinals
 ADV – advanced
 PEN – penalty
 YC – yellow card

Semifinals
 QA – qualified for Final A
 QB – qualified for Final B
 ADV – advanced
 PEN – penalty
 YC – yellow card

Finals

Final B (classification round)

Final A (medal round)

Final standings
The final overall standings were:

References

Men's short track speed skating at the 2014 Winter Olympics